Rule of the road may refer to:
Left- and right-hand traffic, regulations requiring all vehicular traffic to keep either to the left or the right side of the road
Traffic code (also motor vehicle code), the collection of local statutes, regulations, ordinances and rules which that govern public (and sometimes private) ways

See also 
 Rules of the road (disambiguation)